Thayavva is a 1997 Kannada-language film directed by V. Umakanth, starring Sudeep, Umashree, Charan Raj and Sindhu. The background score and soundtrack were composed by V. Manohar, with lyrics by V. Manohar and Geethapriya. This was Sudeep's first film to release after his two previous films were abandoned midway. The film was a box office failure.

Cast
 Sudeep as Raamu
 Umashree as Thayavva 
 Charan Raj 
 Sindhu 
 Avinash
 Ramesh Bhat
 Harish Rai
 Tennis Krishna
 Bank Janardhan
 A. L. Abbaiah Naidu

Production
Sudeep who went on to become a famous star in the Kannada film industry, he made his acting debut with this film. This was the last film produced by A. L. Abbaiah Naidu before his death.

Soundtrack
The music was composed by V. Manohar and released by Lahari Music.

References

External links
 

1990s Kannada-language films
Indian drama films
1997 drama films
1997 films